Jaroslav Dočkal (22 November 1939 – 18 October 2021) was a Czech football player and manager.

Career
Dočkal played for Sparta Prague and Teplice, and later managed Sigma Olomouc, Hradec Králové and Jablonec.

References

1939 births
2021 deaths
Czech footballers
AC Sparta Prague players
FK Teplice players
Czech First League players
Czech football managers
SK Sigma Olomouc managers
FC Hradec Králové managers
FK Jablonec managers
FC Viktoria Plzeň managers
FK Mladá Boleslav managers
Association footballers not categorized by position